Laura Préjean (born 1978) is a French actress who is the daughter of actor Patrick Préjean and the granddaughter of actors Albert Préjean and Lysiane Rey.

Biography

Dubbing roles

Television animation
Argai: The Prophecy (Angéle)
American Dragon: Jake Long (Rose (Mae Whitman))
Avatar: The Last Airbender (Katara (Mae Whitman))
Love Hina (Mitsune "Kitsune" Konno (Junko Noda))
As Told by Ginger (Miranda Killgallen (Cree Summer))
Teen Titans (Terra (Ashley Johnson))
Totally Spies! (GLADYS)
My Life as a Teenage Robot (Jenny Wakeman/XJ-9 (Janice Kawaye))

Theatrical animation
Howl's Moving Castle (Young Sophie (Chieko Baisho))

Live action
The Butterfly Effect (Kayley Miller (Amy Smart))
Charlie's Angels (Dylan Sanders (Drew Barrymore))
Charlie's Angels: Full Throttle (Dylan Sanders (Drew Barrymore))
Constantine (Angela and Isabel Dodson (Rachel Weisz))
Coyote Ugly (Cammie (Izabella Miko))
Hitch (Allegra Cole (Amber Valletta))
The Mummy (Evelyn Carnahan (Rachel Weisz))
The Mummy Returns (Evelyn Carnahan (Rachel Weisz))
The Good Place (Eleanor Shellstrop (Kristen Bell))

Television
2011-2014 : Joséphine, ange gardien TV Series (2 Episodes)
2007-2019 : The Big Bang Theory TV Series (Penny (Kaley Cuoco)) (279 Episodes)
2022-present : Miraculous: Tales of Ladybug & Cat Noir (Socqueline Wang) (2 Episodes)

References

French voice actresses
Living people
1977 births